Department of Forests is a ministerial office jurisdicted by Government of West Bengal.

Ministerial Team
This department is located at Arayna Bhawan at Salt Lake, Kolkata. It works for forest and wildlife in West Bengal. Naturally, changes have also been made in the Forest Organization, in consideration of the present day need of the administration to meet the whole gamut of functions of forest and wildlife management, consolidation of participatory forest management in different agro climatic regions and execution on a very large scale of activities related to social/farm/urban forestry in non-forest areas of the state. In 1974, West Bengal Forest Development Corporation Ltd. Came into being for large scale harvesting of forest produces, creation of new eco-tourism centres, productions and marketing of forest products and such allied activities. The administration of West Bengal Forest Development Corporation Limited at various level is headed by the officers of the Forest Directorate on deputation.

The current minister in charge is Jyotipriya Mallick since 2021 and minister of state is Birbaha Hansda.

References

Government departments of West Bengal
Forest administration in India
West Bengal